Werner Giger (17 April 1949 - 31 July 1974) was a Grand Prix motorcycle road racer from Switzerland. His best year was in 1973 when he finished in fourth place in the 500cc world championship. Giger was killed in 1974 during practice for a race in Hämeenlinna, Finland.

Grand Prix motorcycle racing results 
Points system from 1969 onwards:

(key) (Races in bold indicate pole position; races in italics indicate fastest lap)

References 

1949 births
1974 deaths
Swiss motorcycle racers
250cc World Championship riders
350cc World Championship riders
500cc World Championship riders
Motorcycle racers who died while racing
Sport deaths in Finland